Bibby Line is a UK company concerned with shipping and marine operations.

Its parent company, Bibby Line Group Limited, can be traced back to John Bibby who founded the company in 1807. The company along with the group is based in Liverpool. Since 2007, Bibby Line Group and its employees have donated over £10 million and thousands of volunteering hours to over 1,000 charitable causes.

History

The Bibby Line was founded in 1807 by the first John Bibby (1775–1840). It has operated in most areas of shipping throughout its 200-year history, and claims to be the oldest independently owned deep sea shipping line in the world. 

It was one of the first business in the world to fit its entire fleet with radio, by the British based Radio Communication Company.

Along with other British ship owners, it endured hard economic conditions in the 1970s and 1980s, but survived through diversification into floating accommodation. The group diversified in the 1980s into separate divisions, including Bibby Financial Services which was formed in 1982. The parent company is now called Bibby Line Group, and is a £800 million global business, operating in 14 countries, employing 4,000 people in sectors including retail, financial services, distribution, shipping, marine and infrastructure.

In 2002 Sir Derek Bibby, 2nd baronet, and great-great-grandson of the founder and past chairman and president of the firm, was aged 80 and terminally ill with leukaemia. He committed suicide at home on 9 October 2002 by taking the poison aluminium phosphide. Hours later the poison caused his body to emit dangerous fumes that forced the evacuation of Arrowe Park Hospital where his body was being held.

Ships
Bibby Line currently has no ships.

Former fleet
Vessels that have previously operated for Bibby Line include:

 
  -  Lost on 9 September 1980 during Typhoon Orchid with all 44 hands onboard. Largest British vessel ever lost at sea.
 
  – wrecked on Cardigan Island in 1934 while on the way to be scrapped
 
 
 
 
 Leicestershire – sold, renamed  and sunk in the Aegean Sea in 1966.
 Oxfordshire – official number 131454, recorded travelling  Liverpool - Marseilles - Port Said - Colombo - Rangoon, departing Liverpool 2 March 1923 [UK and Ireland, Outward Passenger Lists, 1890-1960, Liverpool, 2 March 1923].
 
 Somersetshire
 
 Worcestershire

See also

Bibby baronets
Bibby Financial Services
Costcutter
Sir Derek Bibby

References

External links
Bibby Line Group – official website
 – unofficial history

Companies based in Liverpool
Shipping companies of England
Shipping companies of the United Kingdom
British companies established in 1807
Transport companies established in 1807